Corrigon (Hebrew: קוריגון) was a Tel Aviv-based visual search company founded in 2007 by Einav Itamar and Avinoam Omer. Corrigon's main business is in the field of copyright monitoring: Corrigon provided image monitoring that identified how and where images are being used in the internet and in print.

Corrigon's Image identifier used content-based image retrieval algorithms to identify images even when they have been colorized, cropped, or otherwise modified. The user's interface was web-based. The system identified all images found on the web that looked similar to the input images, and generated a periodic usage report for Corrigon's clients.

Corrigon was acquired by eBay in October 2016 for $20 million. Corrigon’s team looks like it will all be joining the company, and it will continue to operate out of Israel, where eBay already has a structured data group in place in Netanya.

References

External links 
 Corrigon.com web site
 Seed investment

Copyright enforcement companies
Business services companies established in 2007
2016 mergers and acquisitions
EBay
Israeli companies established in 2007
2016 disestablishments in Israel
Business services companies disestablished in 2016
Defunct companies of Israel